Magdalena Maleeva was the defending champion, but was forced to withdraw in quarterfinals.

Iva Majoli won the title by defeating Mary Pierce 6–4, 6–4 in the final.

Seeds

Draw

Finals

Top half

Bottom half

External links
 Official results archive (ITF)
 Official results archive (WTA)

1995 Singles
European Indoors - Singles